Osuchy  is a village in the administrative district of Gmina Łukowa, within Biłgoraj County, Lublin Voivodeship, in eastern Poland. The village has a population of 155.

During World War II the battle of Osuchy took place nearby.

References

Villages in Biłgoraj County